Edward Henry Berkeley Portman, 9th Viscount Portman (22 April 1934 – 2 May 1999), was a British peer.

Biography
Portman was the elder son of the Hon Michael Berkeley Portman (20 January 1906–25 October 1959) and the grandson of Gerald Berkeley Portman, 7th Viscount Portman.  His father's elder brother was Gerald William Berkeley Portman, 8th Viscount Portman. Portman inherited the viscountcy on the death of his uncle in 1967.

Portman alleged that Arnold Goodman, Baron Goodman had stolen funds worth £10 million from his family's trust over a 30-year period and made donations to the Labour Party. Portman commenced legal proceedings for recovery but the claim was never substantiated and the research of Goodman's biographer concluded that it had no substance.

Marriages and children
Portman married Rosemary Joy Farris, daughter of Charles Farris, on 26 September 1956.  They had two children:

 Christopher Edward Berkeley Portman, 10th Viscount Portman (b. 30 July 1958) married Caroline Steenson on 30 July 1983 and they were divorced in 1987. They have one son. He remarried Patricia Pims on 7 December 1987. They have two sons.
 The Hon Claire Elizabeth Portman (b. 1 October 1959)  married Anthony Henry Robinson on 8 January 1983. They have three sons: 
 Anthony Edward Robinson (b. 2 April 1984) 
 James Henry Robinson (b. 30 May 1985) 
 Patrick Robinson (b. 12 June 1987)

They were divorced in 1965 and Portman was subsequently married to Penelope Anne Allin on 31 March 1966. They had four sons:

 The Hon Alexander Michael Berkeley Portman (born 19 August 1967)  married Emma Morgan in 1992. They have two sons:
 Maximilian Edward Berkeley Portman (b. 2 January 1996) 
 Jago Alexander Berkeley Portman (b. 22 May 2000)
 The Hon Justin Trevor Berkeley Portman (b. 23 February 1969) married Natalia Vodianova in November 2001 and they were divorced in 2010. They have three children. He remarried Morgan Snyder in June 2019. They have two children. 
 Lucas Alexander Berkeley Portman (b. 22 December 2001) 
 Neva Portman (b. 24 March 2006)
 Viktor Portman (b. 13 September 2007)
 Leo James Berkeley Portman (b. 24 July 2019)
 Star Charlotte Berkeley Portman (b. 25 September 2021)
 The Hon Piers Richard Berkeley Portman (b. 30 May 1971) married Alexandra Thompson on 17 June 1995 and they were divorced in 2001. They have one daughter. He remarried Tracy Brower in 2004. They have one son.
 Willow Isabella Portman (b. 1 September 1998)
 Inigo Portman b. b 10 Feb 2005
 The Hon Matthew Gerald Berkeley Portman (born 12 August 1973, accidentally killed 9 September 1990)

Death
Portman died on 5 May 1999 at age 65 and was succeeded in the viscountcy by his eldest son, Christopher.

References

External links

1934 births
1999 deaths
Viscounts in the Peerage of the United Kingdom
British landowners
Edward